A redundant array of independent memory (RAIM) is a design feature found in certain computers' main random access memory. RAIM utilizes additional memory modules and striping algorithms to protect against the failure of any particular module and keep the memory system operating continuously. RAIM is similar in concept to a redundant array of independent disks (RAID), which protects against the failure of a disk drive, but in the case of memory it supports several DRAM device chipkills and entire memory channel failures. RAIM is much more robust than parity checking and ECC memory technologies which cannot protect against many varieties of memory failures.

On July 22, 2010, IBM introduced the first high end computer server featuring RAIM, the zEnterprise 196. Each z196 machine contains up to 3 TB (usable) of RAIM-protected main memory. In 2011 the business class model z114 was introduced also supporting RAIM. The formal announcement letter offered some additional information regarding the implementation:

See also 
 IBM mainframe

References

Computer memory
Error detection and correction
Fault-tolerant computer systems